Ronald William McIvor (23 March 1951 – December 2021) was a Scottish footballer, who played for Bonnyrigg Rose Athletic, East Fife, Wigan Athletic and Preston Makedonia. McIvor died in December 2021, at the age of 70.

References

External links

1951 births
2021 deaths
Footballers from Edinburgh
Scottish footballers
Association football fullbacks
East Fife F.C. players
Wigan Athletic F.C. players
Scottish Football League players
English Football League players
Bonnyrigg Rose Athletic F.C. players
Preston Lions FC players